The Second Company Law Directive 2012/30/EU (sometimes also called the "Capital Directive") is a European Union Directive concerning the capital requirements of public companies that operating within the European Union. A number of its provisions have become increasingly controversial since its enactment in 1976, as many rules for the maintenance and alteration of capital have been abandoned within EU member states, particularly regarding the use of minimum capital (currently set at €25,000), and the accounting concept of nominal share value. Nevertheless, a large number of its rules are still seen as essential for the protection of creditors, to attempt to forestall insolvency.

Contents
art 1, application to public limited companies, but investment companies and cooperatives can be completely exempted
art 2, information must be publicised when a company is incorporated on its name, objects, capital subscriptions, and governance rules
art 3, information to go to the registrar
art 4, liability rules for people who begin companies without proper registration 
art 5, companies with one person should not be automatically abolished
art 6, minimum capital of €25,000 for public companies, revisable every five years
art 7, an undertaking to do work cannot be part of a company's subscribed capital
art 8, no issue of shares at a discount on nominal value
art 9, shares should be paid up to at least 25% of their nominal value
arts 10–13, if shares are bought with assets, rather than cash, they must be independently valued
art 17, distributions below subscribed capital not allowed
art 18, shareholders must return money if the must have known of an infringement
art 19, a meeting must be called if there is a serious capital loss
art 20, companies cannot subscribe for their own shares
arts 21–22, companies can buy back their own shares so long as shareholders are treated equally, and subject to a series of other conditions
arts 23–24, also buy backs
art 25, financial assistance for share purchase
art 26, ensure no conflicts of interest for related party transactions
art 28, if a public company's subsidiary, which is under a dominant influence, buys shares then the public company itself is regarded as buying the shares. Defines the concept of dominant influence.
arts 29–33, increases in capital, rights of pre-emption
arts 34–42, reductions in capital
art 43, redeemable shares, conditions attached
art 45(1) member states can derogate from the "first paragraph of Article 9, the first sentence of point (a) of Article 21(1) and Articles 29, 30 and 33 to the extent that such derogations are necessary for the adoption or application of provisions designed to encourage the participation of employees". (2) "Member States may decide not to apply the first sentence of point (a) of Article 21(1) and Articles 34, 35, 40, 41, 42 and 43 to companies incorporated under a special law which issue both capital shares and workers' shares, the latter being issued to the company's employees as a body, who are represented at general meetings of shareholders by delegates having the right to vote."
art 46, principle of equal treatment of shareholders
arts 47–50, final transitional and temporal provisions

Court of Justice decisions
The Directives provisions on freedom of establishment had determined that minimum capital was a disproportionate means to achieve the aim of protecting creditors. These decisions have only been made in relation to national laws regarding private companies, and not yet the EU Directive itself. It is unclear to what extent it would be regarded as compatible with the TFEU.

Gebhard v Consiglio dell'Ordine degli Avvocati e Procuratori di Milano [1995] ECR I-4165 (C-55/94)
Centros Ltd v Erhversus-og Selkabssyrelsen [1999] ECR I-1459 (C-212/97)
Überseering BV v Nordic Construction Company Baumanagement GmbH (C-208/00)
Kamer van Koophandel en Fabrieken voor Amsterdam v Inspire Art Ltd [2003] ECR I-10155 (C-167/01)

See also
EU company law
UK company law
German company law

Notes

References

External links
77/91/EEC, original Directive
2006/68/EC, amendments
2009/109/EC, amendments
2012/30/EU, recasting the Directive

Corporate law